Maurice Cuffe  was an Irish politician.

Cuffe  was born in Castleinch and educated at  Trinity College, Dublin.

Cuffe  represented Kilkenny City from 1715 to 1727.

References

Irish MPs 1715–1727
Members of the Parliament of Ireland (pre-1801) for County Kilkenny constituencies
Alumni of Trinity College Dublin
People from County Kilkenny